The , signed as Route 15, is one of the tolled routes of the Hanshin Expressway system serving the Keihanshin area in Kansai, Japan. It travels in a north to south direction from the Chūō ward of Osaka, beginning at a junction with Sennichi-mae-dōri, to National Route 26 in the city of Sakai.

Route description
The Sakai Route travels in a north to south direction from the Chūō ward of Osaka, beginning as a one-way highway at junction with Sennichi-mae-dōri. The one-way route meets the Loop Route twice in central Osaka, once on the loop's eastern side and again on its western side in Namba. At the second junction with the Loop Route, the Sakai Route's northbound traffic terminates, continuing south towards the city of Sakai as a dual carriageway. From there, it briefly parallels the Hanshin Namba Line to Shiomibashi Station where the expressway curves to the south. In the Nishinari ward the expressway meets the Nishi-Osaka Route; however the junction between the two routes is limited to two ramps: one that travels from northbound traffic of the Sakai Route to begin the westbound side of the Nishi-Osaka Route and another that leads eastbound traffic of the Nishi-Osaka Route onto the southbound side of the Sakai Route.

The expressway crosses into Sakai at a bridge over the Yamato River. A planned junction between the Yamatogawa Route and the Sakai Route would be on the southern bank of the river. The expressway meets its southern terminus upon meeting National Route 26 in Sakai, though the roadway continues as the national route.

History
Construction of the Nishi-Osaka Route began in 1967 in preparation for the Expo '70 held in the nearby city of Suita. The first section of the expressway was completed after three years of construction in 1970. Another  section of the expressway that runs within the confines of the Loop Route in central Osaka was opened in 1972. The entire expressway was completed by 1976.

Future
Plans for a junction between the Sakai Route and the Yamatogawa Route have been made, but as of November 2020 there has been no progress in building the interchange.

List of interchanges
The entire expressway lies within Osaka Prefecture.

See also

References

External links

Roads in Osaka Prefecture
15
1970 establishments in Japan